The Leșunțul Mare is a right tributary of the river Oituz in Romania. It discharges into the Oituz in Ferestrău-Oituz.

References

Rivers of Romania
Rivers of Bacău County